The 1986 Labatt Brier was held from March 2 to 9 at the Kitchener Memorial Auditorium in Kitchener, Ontario.

Ed Lukowich of Alberta defeated Russ Howard of Ontario to win his second Brier title.

Teams

Round-robin standings

Round-robin results

Draw 1

Draw 2

Draw 3

Draw 4

Draw 5

Draw 6

Draw 7

Draw 8

Draw 9

Draw 10

Draw 11

Draw 12

Draw 13

Draw 14

Draw 15

^ This game is set a Brier record for shortest game, ending after four ends.

Tiebreaker

Playoffs

Semifinal

Final

Statistics

Top 5 player percentages
Round Robin only

Team percentages
Round Robin only

References

Sport in Kitchener, Ontario
1986
1986 in Canadian curling
Curling in Ontario
1986 in Ontario